The Million Pound Motors is a British Television show starring Miles Jupp, Tom Hartley, Adam Stott, Richard Biddulph and Sheik Amari. The program is directed by Rachael Kinley. The first episode was aired on 7 December 2015. The airing network is Channel 4.

The program is created and produced by Jayne Edwards and Guy Gilbert under production company "Off the Fence".

Plot
The Million Pound Motors is a first cut documentary show where Britains rich and famous men and women meet for selling the high speed luxury vehicles. It includes multimillionaires Tom Hartley, Adam Stott, Amari Supercar.

Cast
Tom Hartley
Miles Jupp as narrator
Richard Biddulph
Adam Stott
Sheik Amari

References

External links
 
 The Million Pound Motors on Channel 4

English-language television shows
2015 British television series debuts